NuSMV is a reimplementation and extension of SMV symbolic model checker, the first model checking tool based on Binary Decision Diagrams (BDDs).
The tool has been designed as an open architecture for model checking. It is aimed at reliable verification of industrially sized designs, for use as a backend for other verification tools and as a research tool for formal verification techniques.

NuSMV has been developed as a joint project between ITC-IRST (Istituto Trentino di Cultura in Trento, Italy), Carnegie Mellon University, the University of Genoa and the University of Trento.

NuSMV 2, version 2 of NuSMV, inherits all the functionalities of NuSMV. Furthermore, it combines BDD-based model checking with SAT-based model checking. It is maintained by Fondazione Bruno Kessler, the successor organization of ITC-IRST.

Functionalities 
NuSMV supports the analysis of specifications expressed in CTL and LTL.  User interaction is performed with a textual interface, as well as in batch mode.

Running NuSMV Interactively 
The interaction shell of NuSMV is activated from the system prompt as follows:
[system_prompt]$ NuSMV -int
NuSMV> go
NuSMV>
NuSMV first tries to read and execute commands from an initialization file if such file exists and is readable unless -s is passed on the command line.
File master.nusmvrc is looked for in directory defined in environment variable NUSMV _LIBRARY_PATH or in default library path if no such variable is defined. If no such file exists, user's home directory and current directory will also be checked. Commands in the initialization file are executed consecutively. When initialization phase is completed the NuSMV shell is displayed and the system is now ready to execute user commands.

A NuSMV command usually consists of a command name and arguments to the invoked command. It is possible to make NuSMV read and execute a sequence of commands from a file, through the command line option -source:
[system_prompt]$ NuSMV -source cmd_file

Running NuSMV batch 
When the -int option is not specified, NuSMV runs as a batch program, which is with the form as follows:
[system_prompt]$ NuSMV [command line options] input_file

Checking for LTL specification or CTL specification 
NuSMV can be used to check whether the predefined LTL or CTL constraints holds for the defined model.
For example, we have a CTL specification that we want to check:
CTLSPEC EF(proc5.state = critical);
This specification checks if there exists an execution path such that the state of process 5 is critical at some point.
User can check to see if their model holds for this specification using the following commands.
[system_prompt]$ NuSMV [command line options] input_file
NuSMV> go
NuSMV> check_ctlspec
If the specification is true, NuSMV will inform you with
-- specification EF proc5.state = critical  is true
>NuSMV
However, if the specification fails at some state, NuSMV will return a full trace of execution showing how it fails.

See also 
 Spin Model Checker a general model checker for asynchronous software systems
 CADP (Construction and Analysis of Distributed Processes), a toolbox for the formal design of asynchronous concurrent systems

References

External links 
 NuSMV website
 Nuseen website: a set of tools based on eclipse for the model checker NuSMV.
 nuXmv: Extends NuSMV with SMT-based verification and updated SAT solving techniques

Model checkers
Free software programmed in C